Aaron Roussell is an American college basketball coach, currently the women's head coach at the University of Richmond.  Roussell is a 2001 graduate of the University of Iowa and he began his college coaching career as a graduate assistant at Minnesota State. After two seasons there, Roussell spent eight years as head women's basketball coach at the University of Chicago. Roussell then spent seven seasons as head coach at Bucknell University before being named head coach at Richmond on April 2, 2019.

Head coaching record

Sources:

References

External links
University of Richmond biography

Living people
American women's basketball coaches
Chicago Maroons women's basketball coaches
Bucknell Bison women's basketball coaches
Richmond Spiders women's basketball coaches
Year of birth missing (living people)